Babar Mahal, Baber Mahal is a Rana palace in Kathmandu, the capital of Nepal. The palace complex, located north of the Bagmati river, was incorporated in an impressive and vast array of courtyards, gardens and buildings. Initially the palace was under Jung Bahadur Rana's Thapathali Durbar but later was separated and demolished and rebuilt by Chandra Shumsher Jang Bahadur Rana, as prime minister and the executive leader of Nepal.

History

The palace complex lay in the heart of Kathmandu, to the north of the Bagmati River. The history of the place is closely linked with the history of Nepal and its rulers.

Part of Thapathali 
The Thapathali Durbar complex occupies over 80 Ropanis of which Babar Mahal was a part. After the fall of the Thapa aristocracy, Jung Bahadur Rana began to live in his grandfather's Thapathali Durbar. After Bhandarkhal Parva in 1904 BS, he was able to seize all of the immediate property of his maternal uncle PM Mathabarsingh Thapa and grandfather PM Bhimsen Thapa. During this acquisition Jung also acquired the Thapathali Durbar complex. As a head of all state affairs Jung Bahadur built a lavish new palace within the Thapathali complex under his royal architect Ranasur Bista.
After Junga's death the palace was inherited by his sons and wives. In 1942 BS, the Shamsher brothers' revolt against Jung Bahadur Rana's sons and finally the Shamsher Brothers exiled the Junga sons. After this Dev Shumsher Jang Bahadur Rana acquired this property in 1958 BS. Upon Dev Shumsher Jang Bahadur Rana's exile the palace was inherited by Chandra Shumsher Jang Bahadur Rana.

Baber Shamsher
After accruing this property Chandra Shumsher Jang Bahadur Rana demolished the old five-storey palace and built a new palace in BS 1966/67 which was designed by Ranasur Bista and constructed a new palace under the architect engineer Kumar Narasingh Rana and Kishor Narasingh Rana. Chandra Shumsher Jang Bahadur Rana then gifted this brand new palace to his son Baber Shamsher Jang Bahadur Rana and named the palace after him.

Under Government of Nepal
After the fall of the Rana regime, Babar Mahal was occupied and owned by Baber Shamsher Jang Bahadur Rana but later he sold it to the government of Nepal. Currently the palace is occupied by Department of Roads, Office of Accountant General of Nepal and Nepal Oil Corporation.

Earthquake 2015
This Palace was seriously damaged during the April 2015 Nepal earthquake. Babar Mahal was designated unsafe and received a red sticker. Currently the Department of Roads, Office of Auditor General of Nepal
has started evacuation. The future of the Historical building is unknown.

See also
Babarmahal Revisited
Thapathali Durbar
Jung Bahadur Rana

References

Palaces in Kathmandu
Rana palaces of Nepal